Robin Hood's Bay railway station was a railway station on the Scarborough & Whitby Railway situated  from Scarborough and  from Whitby  It opened on 16 July 1885, and served the fishing village of Robin Hood's Bay, and to a lesser extent the village of Fylingthorpe. On the north-bound journey trains had to climb a mile and a half at 1-in-43 out of the station.

History
The railway between Scarborough and Whitby opened in July 1885, with most stations on the line, including Robin Hood's Bay, opening on the 16 of the month. Robin Hood's Bay had two platforms which worked as a passing loop, with the station buildings, mostly made of stone, on the south side (Scarborough bound direction) of the station. The signal box was also located on the Scarborough-bound direction (the Up line).

The goods yard had a  crane and could handle all kinds of freight. With five sidings, cattle dock, coal yard, goods shed, and weighbridge, it was the largest intermediate station on the line. 

Incoming freight largely consisted of coal, with Robin Hood's Bay being the second busiest on the line with that commodity after  station. Outward freight consisted of seafood and gravel;  was recorded as having left the station in 1913. The station sent crabs to London and winkles to King's Lynn.

The station was host to a LNER camping coach in 1935, possibly one for some of 1934 and three coaches from 1936 to 1939. Three coaches were positioned here by North Eastern Region of British Railways from 1954 and five from 1957 to 1964. After closure of the Whitby to Loftus route, most camping coaches were located on the Scarborough to Whitby line, with the greater number at Robin Hood's Bay possibly being due to the availability of electricity.

Freight services were officially withdrawn on 10 August 1964, however, the last freight train to Robin Hood's Bay ran on 16 August 1964, as some of the final freight to be forwarded to the station arrived late at Scarborough Gallows Close. The last passenger service was on 6 March 1965, but there was no service at that time of year on Sundays, so the station closed on 8 March.

The station building survives, it and the former stationmaster's house are used as holiday accommodation. Only a small part of the down platform remains. The former trackbed forms part of the Scarborough to Whitby Railway Path. The goods shed was adapted into a village hall, the new-build northern part of which straddles the trackbed.

Services
Some services reversed at West Cliff and descended the branch into Whitby Town, which was a further .

Between 1902 and 1922 when the North Eastern Railway were running the trains, an average of five services ran each way, along the whole length of the line calling at all stations between Scarborough and Whitby Town, with a reversal at Whitby West Cliff. By the spring timetable of 1939, the basic pattern was still five trains per day, with an extra seven by the end of June for the start of the summer season. In 1946, the services were down to four a day, with an extra four during the summer season. Robin Hood's Bay was the only station on the line that enjoyed the provision of all services calling there. The other stations on the line, barring the two end stations, were served sporadically.

In the summer of 1962, nine services ran the length of the line, but the winter season amounted to three trips each way. DMUs had been introduced in 1958, which sped up the reversals at Whitby and Scarborough.

Incidents
As the Up line left the station westwards, the points led to the main running line and a short siding which ran over the road between Fylingthorpe and Robin Hood's Bay, before ending in a siding. This siding was the scene of two accidents;

July 1939 – a Scarborough-bound train departed the station against the signals and derailed on the siding.
October 1961 – a ballast train descending the 1-in-43 bank from  ran out of control, and the signaller diverted the train onto the siding, which resulted in the buffer-stop being pushed  from the end of the line.

References

Sources

Further reading

External links

 Robin Hood's Bay station on navigable 1947 O. S. map
 Robin Hood's Bay station on Disused Stations

Disused railway stations in the Borough of Scarborough
Former North Eastern Railway (UK) stations
Beeching closures in England
Railway stations in Great Britain opened in 1885
Railway stations in Great Britain closed in 1965
1885 establishments in England
1965 disestablishments in England